Clara Esther Klinghoffer (18 May 1900 – 18 November 1970) was a British artist, notable for her paintings and drawings.

Klinghoffer was born to Polish-Jewish parents in Szczerzec, located about 20 km to the southwest of what was once Lwów, Poland, but at the time of her birth was known as Lemberg, then part of Austria-Hungary. She was brought to England as a baby in 1903. The family lived in Manchester before settling in the East End of London. After attending the Sir John Cass College of Art, she studied at the Central School of Arts and Crafts and at the Slade School of Art from 1919 to 1921. Klinghoffer married the journalist and author Joseph W. F. Stoppelman in 1926. She lived in the Netherlands and France from 1930 to 1939 and then in the United States throughout World War II. While Klinghoffer was based in New York for the rest of her life, she traveled widely in Mexico and Europe, and returned often to her beloved London.

Early career 
Klinghoffer had her first one-woman exhibition of sixty works in London during 1919, when she was 19. The critics hailed her as "Masterly” - "…a dazzling radiance that has no equal at present in Pall Mall.” - "A revelation. That is the point of Clara Klinghoffer’s genius.” - "Her work shows the influence of Rembrandt and Hals.” - and the Daily Graphic hailed her debut with the headline, "Girl Who Draws Like Raphael – Success At 19".   The review opened with: "Miss Clara Klinghoffer must be regarded as a new star. Her work is strongly individualistic and original, her point of view strictly her own, her power great. If she elects to do a thing it is done with masterful force.”

When Klinghoffer showed a talent for drawing at just 14, her parents were determined that she should have an opportunity to make something of it.  Though poor, family funds were made available for art materials and for her to briefly attend the Sir John Cass College of Art in Aldgate. At 15, carrying a portfolio nearly as large as she, Clara visited London’s Central School of Arts & Crafts where, upon seeing her work, Bernard Meninsky commented, "Good Lord, that child draws like da Vinci.”

Invited to attend the Slade – but with the counsel that the teachers there would not be able to teach her anything more – she stayed for two years and won the admiration of Alfred Wolmark. He, and mentors such as Jacob Epstein and Meninsky, recommended her to the Hampstead Gallery which featured her work in 1919. Her many press clippings and Reviews and the Museum collections worldwide which purchased her artwork, including the Tate Gallery and the National Portrait Gallery,  document Clara's fame through the next ten years in England and Europe.

In 1932, the English publication Women of Today wrote:

"A woman who became a famous painter overnight at the age of 19, Miss Klinghoffer is holding her first one-man show for six years at the Redfern Gallery today. Now universally recognized as one of the greatest English woman painters, she was a poor and utterly unknown young girl from the East End when her first exhibition took the artistic world by storm in 1919. Hailed everywhere as the girl who could draw like Raphael, her superb technique has always been compared with the Old Masters, but at the time of her first show she had never seen any of the great Old Masters pictures."

Marriage 
On July 29, 1926, she married Dutch journalist and author Joseph ("Joop") Willem Ferdinand Stoppelman at that Duke Street Great Synagogue in London. In 1929 moved to Holland with their daughter, Sonia.  Clara's son, Michael, was born in Amsterdam.  Despite a difficult husband's jealousy of her fame and family and the rising Nazi threat, she managed to combine raising a family with a career that had garnered acclaim throughout Europe.

Years in the United States 
In 1939, discovering Nazi spies had been planted in the household staff and aware that the invasion of Holland was imminent, the family returned to London briefly before departing for the United States. Before leaving Holland, their household furniture and some of her artwork were placed in storage in a  Haarlem warehouse and  subsequently stolen by the Nazis.

In 1945, following the war, Klinghoffer divided her time between her studios in London and New York.  Although she had exhibited in the United States during the forties, fifties and sixties, she refused to join the abstract expressionism which had become so popular in America and her prominence was overshadowed by what she referred to as the splatter and drip approach to art.

Later career and death 
In 1981, Terrence Mullaly, in the Daily Telegraph wrote, “If ever there was an artist who for some time has been unjustly forgotten, it is Clara Klinghoffer … While the temporary eclipse of her reputation was not, given trends in the visual arts, surprising, it is certainly lamentable. She was a portrait painter of sensitive talent and, above all, a fine draughtsman …  In her work her obvious sensitivity towards her sitters is manifested, and enforced by her ability not only to suggest weight and substance of a body, but also to convey mood … When much more celebrated artists are forgotten, she will be remembered.”

Clara Klinghoffer died in London on April 18, 1970 at the age of 69. She is buried at the Cheshunt Cemetery near London.

Reviews 
"I consider Clara Klinghoffer an artist of great talent, a painter of the first order…Her understanding of form places her in the very first rank of draughtsmen in the world." 

– Sir Jacob Epstein, London

"Clara Klinghoffer’s drawings are comparable to the great Italian Masters." 

– Mary Chamot: “Modern Painters in England”

"When (Clara Klinghoffer) was less than twenty she was already recognized by the dealers and by the artists who count as an important character in the world of art. One critic said of her that she was ‘full of the beautiful spirit of Raphael,’ while another wrote that she was under the influence of Leonardo, whose style, he said, she adapted to suit her personality."

"Be that as it may, the fact is that, in her teens, without money or influence, and living in the non-fashionable end of London, she has made her mark in the center of the most difficult city in the world…I am convinced she can become, by the time she is forty, a really great master, creating priceless art treasures.”

– Amelia DeFries, November, 1923

Exhibition at the Royal Academy: "Augustus John remains faithful and his Serving Maid is one of the few pictures in the whole show that one carries away in one’s head. Almost like John’s work in its bravado is Clara Klinghoffer’s Giuseppina, which also has Miss Klinghoffer’s own peculiar sensitiveness. Its vitality is not secured by any sacrifice of delicacy and its rhythmic unity is untouched by anything else at the exhibition." 

–The Natal Witness, 1935

"Though she has her pictures in the Tate Gallery and the British Museum, Clara Klinghoffer has never had a lesson in painting. At her first exhibition, arranged in 1919 by admirers Jacob Eptsein and Richard Sickert, she was hailed as one of the greatest modern English women painters, but refused bursaries which would have enabled her to study at the Slade."

– News Review, 14 April 1938

"Clara Klinghoffer’s three paintings, which include a study of a head – Leah – as exquisite in colour as it is masterly in its drawing and modeling, are in a class by themselves. Beside the ripe achievement of this highly gifted painter, the remaining exhibits appear the work of novices." 

– Sunday Times, London

"As an expression of personality in paint the portrait of Lucien Pissaro is one of the most successful paintings we have ever seen. It positively simmers with the temperamental qualities of a veteran artist."

– The Times, London

"Clara Klinghoffer - England’s best-known woman artist seen here for the first time. Rare indeed is such mastery of line as shown in her drawings, such subtlety and warmth of paint as in her canvases of women, men, children and types. It is definitely our gain if we can claim her as our own."

– 460 Park Avenue Gallery at 57th Street. (CUE SAYS GO). January 4, 1941

"Something of the charm of the great eighteenth-century French artists, modernized and with more of a broad human basis, is to be found in such works as the sketchy head of a man, or the study of a sick child…This is admirable stuff."

– The New York Times

"One can go through a year of exhibitions and not encounter this sort of draughtsmanship."

– Emily Genauer, New York

"Clara Klinghoffer is one of the greatest talents sent us by the war. This artist has a fascinating grasp of the essentials. Her portraits have a soft focus, but what inner life! Clara Klinghoffer’s Sergei Radamsky is Rembrandtesque in feeling and spiritual quality. Highly sensitive, it is one of the best portraits we have seen in a dog’s age."

– The Art News, January 11, 1941

"Clara Klinghoffer has a precious gift; the power of transmuting the facts of experience into the gold of expression."

– J.B. Manson, curator of the Tate Gallery, writing in The Studio

References

External links

1900 births
1970 deaths
20th-century British artists
20th-century British women artists
Alumni of the Central School of Art and Design
Alumni of the Slade School of Fine Art
British portrait painters